Kruishaar is a hamlet in the Dutch province of Gelderland. It is a part of the municipality of Nijkerk, and lies about 11 km east of Amersfoort. A small part belongs to the municipality of Putten.

It was first mentioned in 1560 as Cruyshaer, and means "sandy ridge with a cross sign". The postal authorities have placed it under Nijkerk. There are no place name signs. There are about 70 living vans in Kruishaar.

References
 

Populated places in Gelderland
Nijkerk
Putten